The Crostolo is a stream (a "torrente") in the Province of Reggio Emilia, Emilia-Romagna Region, Italy. It starts in the Apennines of the province of Reggio Emilia and flows northwards, passing through the provincial capital, Reggio nell'Emilia until it empties into the river Po near Guastalla.

Rivers of Italy
Rivers of the Province of Reggio Emilia